Gökhan Keser (born 9 September 1987) is a Turkish singer, actor, model and producer.

Modelling career
He began his modelling life in 2002. When he placed first in the 'Miss. & Mr. Model' competition he signed to Uğurkan Erez Agency, one of the most prominent casting and modelling agencies in Turkey. He took part in many fashion shows and catalog spreads at home and abroad. In year 2005, Keser participated in 'Best Model Of Turkey and took runner up. which gave him the opportunity to compete in Manhunt International 2006 in China. In a field of 64 international competitors, he got third runner up and the title of 'Mr. Photogenic'.

Acting career
He has taken acting classes from Ayla Algan at Ekol Drama Theatre School. 

In 2006, he began acting in the ATV fantasy child series Selena which ran for 3 seasons and 104 episodes. Nowadays, It is in trending list in Youtube. 

He played in the film based from life of Atçalı Kel Mehmet. He also did the main male role in the cinema film Kayıp Çocuklar Cenneti by director Mete Özgencil. 

Gökhan Keser also featured in Sıla's music videos.

Television

Film

Singing career
Keser also started a music career. He signed with Sony Music and released an album with the help of the producer Şehrazat.

Albums
Gökhan Keser (2012)

Singles
Hadi Oradan (2011)
Seninle Bozdum (2011)
Hiç Vaktim Yok (2014)
Bul Beni (2015)
Beni Özledin mi (2016)
Kimi Sevsem Açıldı Kısmeti (2018)
Yangın (2021)

References

External links
 
 
 

1987 births
Living people
Turkish male models
Turkish male television actors
Turkish male film actors